Populaire (French for "popular"), may refer to:

Populaire (automobile),  manufactured in 1899
Populaire (film), a 2012 French romantic film
Le Populaire (French newspaper), in publication from 1918 to 1970
Le Populaire (Senegalese newspaper)

See also

Popular (disambiguation)